Alarm in Peking is a 1937 German adventure film directed by Herbert Selpin and starring Gustav Fröhlich, Leny Marenbach, and Peter Voß. It is set against the backdrop of the 1900 Boxer Rebellion in China. German filmmakers had frequently used China as a setting since the 1910s, but from 1931 onwards they made a series of films with political overtones.

The film's sets were designed by the art director Alfred Bütow and Willi Herrmann. It was shot at the Johannisthal Studios in Berlin.

Cast
 Gustav Fröhlich as Oberleutnant Brock
 Leny Marenbach as Maria
 Peter Voß as Captain Cunningham
 Herbert Hübner as Korvettenkapitän von Radain
 Bernhard Minetti as Tu-Hang
 Rosa Jung as Yung-Li
 Paul Westermeier as Sergeant Mück
 Ferdinand Classen as Tschang
 Joachim Rake as Leutnant Torelli
 Günther Lüders as Gefreiter Lüdecke
 Hugo Fischer-Köppe as Sergeant Micky
 Arthur Reinhardt as Brandes
 Adolf Fischer as Reiter
 Leopold von Ledebur as Generalkonsul
 Georg H. Schnell as Gesandter
 Karl Günther as Kommandeur

References

Bibliography

External links

1937 films
1930s historical adventure films
German historical adventure films
Films of Nazi Germany
1930s German-language films
Films directed by Herbert Selpin
Films set in Beijing
Films set in 1900
Films set in the Qing dynasty
Siege films
Boxer Rebellion
Terra Film films
Films shot at Johannisthal Studios
German black-and-white films
1930s German films